Code of the Range is a 1936 American western film directed by Charles C. Coleman and starring Charles Starrett, Mary Blake and Edward Coxen.

Synopsis
A feud breaks out between cattle ranchers and sheepherders who dispute each other's grazing rights.

Cast
 Charles Starrett as 	Lee Jamison
 Mary Blake as Janet Parker
 Edward Coxen as Angus McLeod
 Allan Cavan a s	'Calamity' Parker
 Albert J. Smith as 	Barney Ross
 Edward Peil Sr. as Sheriff
 Edmund Cobb as 	Ed Randall
 Edward LeSaint as 	Adams
 Ralph McCullough as 	Quigley
 George Chesebro as Henchman
 Art Mix as Henchman

References

External links
Code of the Range at the Internet Movie Database

1936 films
American Western (genre) films
1936 Western (genre) films
Films directed by Charles C. Coleman
American black-and-white films
Columbia Pictures films
1930s American films
1930s English-language films